The Church of the Sagrario is a building attached to the north facade of the Jaén Cathedral, made due to the unevenness and damage caused by the Lisbon earthquake of 1755. The project for this work was designed by the Madrid architect Ventura Rodríguez in 1764, although it was executed by his nephew Manuel Martín Rodríguez. It was inaugurated in 1801 and was consecrated on March 22 of that year.

See also 
 Jaén Cathedral

References

17th-century Roman Catholic church buildings in Spain
Conversion of non-Christian religious buildings and structures into churches
Renaissance architecture in Andalusia
Roman Catholic churches in Andalusia
Former mosques in Spain
Buildings and structures in Jaén, Spain